Prymnesiaceae is a family of algae in the clade Haptophyta. It contains toxic microalgae such as Prymnesium.

Genera 
 Apistonema
 Chrysocampanula
 Chrysoculter
 Corymbellus
 Haptolina
 Hyalolithus
 Imantonia
 Petasaria
 Platychrysis
 Prymnesium
 Pseudohaptolina

References 

Haptophyte families
Eukaryote families